Charles Tangus (born 4 June 1974) is a Kenyan distance and marathon runner. He participated at the IAAF World Half Marathon Championships in 1995 and won a bronze medal finishing third behind fellow Kenyan Paul Yego. He won the Berlin Half Marathon in 1996 and finished seventh in the 1996 Boston Marathon.

External links

1974 births
Living people
Kenyan male long-distance runners
Place of birth missing (living people)
20th-century Kenyan people